Fox Networks Group Middle East  (formerly Fox International Channels FZ LLC) is a commercial television broadcasting company operating in the Middle East and North Africa, a subsidiary of Disney International Operations's Fox Networks Group. FNG Middle East is part of the wider DMED (FNG) EMEA operations.

History
The company was established in 2008 in order to catering to the Arab world and audience to feature American television shows in region.

By 2014, the company took over the distribution of Star World, Star Movies, National Geographic-branded channels, Fox-branded channels, Channel V International, Baby TV and Sky News in the region from Star Select.

In January 2016, 21st Century Fox announced reorganization of Fox International Channels FZ. The heads of FIC's regional divisions was report to CEO Peter Rice and COO Randy Freer at Fox Networks Group in the United States, instead of the outgoing FIC CEO Hernan Lopez and division was renamed Fox Networks Group Middle East.

On 20 March 2019, The Walt Disney Company acquired 21st Century Fox, including Fox Networks Group Middle East and then Rebranded and reorganized it to Disney Middle East FZ LLC

Operations
Television channels operates and/or distributes by Disney Middle East include:

Current

 BabyTV
 Fox
 Fox Movies
 Fox Action Movies
 Fox Life
 Star Movies
 Star World
 National Geographic
 National Geographic Abu Dhabi (free-to-air)
 Nat Geo Wild

Former
 Fox Sports
 Fox Rewayat
 Nat Geo Kids Abu Dhabi (free-to-air)
 National Geographic Farsi (free-to-air)
 Channel V International
 Nat Geo People
 FX
 Fox Family Movies
 Fox Crime

References

External links
 

Communications in the United Arab Emirates
Television networks
Mass media companies established in 2008
Middle East